Spirit of Television  is a syndicated American television anthology series that aired in 1993. Each episode which feature a different show from the 1950s and early 1960s America as well as cast interviews, trivia, and the odd commercial of that time.

Cast
 Gene R. Lowry (Episode 1-6) – Himself, Host
 Michael L. White (episode 7 – 14) – himself, Host

Episodes
 001 – Trouble With Father
 002 – Four Star Playhouse (David Niven)
 003 – Texaco Star Theater
 004 – Judge Roy Bean (TV series)
 005 – Jack Benny Show
 006 – Dragnet
 007 – Make Room for Daddy
 009 – Four Star Playhouse ([Ida Lupino])
 010 – Kraft Television Theater
 011 – Cisco Kid
 012 – The George Burns and Gracie Allen Show
 013 – The Donna Reed Show
 014 – Tribute to Old Tucson

References
 http://www.imdb.com/title/tt1010292/?ref_=fn_al_tt_1

1993 American television series debuts
1993 American television series endings